Glyptoscapus is a genus of beetles in the family Cerambycidae, containing the following species:

 Glyptoscapus bivittatus Gounelle, 1909
 Glyptoscapus cicatricosus Aurivillius, 1899
 Glyptoscapus flaveolus (Bates, 1870)
 Glyptoscapus pallidulus (White, 1855)
 Glyptoscapus vanettii Martins, 1959

References

Ibidionini